= 1949 Liechtenstein Trade, Commerce and Industry Regulation Act referendum =

1949 Liechtenstein trade referendum
- 12 June 1949
- Referendum on the Trade, Commerce and Industry Regulations Act

Results
Choice	Votes	%
Yes	529	21.62%
No	1,918	78.38%
Valid votes	2,447	94.55%
Invalid or blank votes	141	5.45%
Total votes	2,588	100.00%
Registered voters/turnout	3,322	77.9%

A referendum on the Trade, Commerce and Industry Regulations Act was held in Liechtenstein on 12 June 1949. The Act had been passed by the Landtag, but was rejected by 78.4% of voters.

== Results ==
Choice	Votes	%
For	529	21.6
Against	1,918	78.4
Invalid/blank votes	141	–
Total	2,588	100
Registered voters/turnout	3,322	77.9
Source: Nohlen & Stöver
